Iván Azón Monzón (born 24 December 2002) is a Spanish footballer who plays for Real Zaragoza as a forward.

Club career
Born in Zaragoza, Aragon, Azón joined Real Zaragoza's youth setup from UD Amistad. He spent the 2018–19 season on loan at EM El Olivar after nursing a knee injury, but returned to the side ahead of the 2019–20 campaign, also playing in the UEFA Youth League.

Azón made his senior debut with the reserves on 18 July 2020, coming on as a second-half substitute in a 0–1 Tercera División away loss against SD Tarazona, in the promotion play-offs. He made his first team debut on 8 November, replacing Gabriel Fernández at half-time in a 0–1 away loss against CD Tenerife in the Segunda División championship.

Azón scored his first senior goal on 16 December 2020, netting the opener in a 2–0 away win against Gimnástica de Torrelavega, for the season's Copa del Rey. His first league goal came on the following 2 January, as he netted the equalizer in a 1–1 draw at FC Cartagena.

On 14 January 2021, Azón renewed his contract until 2024.

References

External links

2002 births
Living people
Footballers from Zaragoza
Spanish footballers
Association football forwards
Segunda División players
Tercera División players
Real Zaragoza B players
Real Zaragoza players
Spain under-21 international footballers